Madhubani Medical College and Hospital is a private Medical college in Madhubani, Bihar.

History and courses
It was established in 2018 and received permission to take admission from the Medical Council of India in 2019. The college imparts the degree of Bachelor of Medicine and Surgery (MBBS). Nursing and para-medical courses are also offered. The college is affiliated to Aryabhatta Knowledge University and is approved by the Medical Council of India. The selection to the college is done on the basis of merit through National Eligibility and Entrance Test. The unitary campus consists of a college building, hospital building, hostels for students, residents and nurses, quarters for teaching and non-teaching staff.

Courses
Madhubani Medical College, undertakes education and training of students for MBBS courses. This college is offering 150 MBBS seats from 2019. This college also offered Nursing and Paramedic courses.

Hospital

The hospital caters to all sections of society of the region and charges are highly subsidised for poor patients. The hospital consists of 24x7 emergency services, ICU, SICU, NICU, modular operation theatres, central laboratory, CT Scan, ultrasound and fully licensed blood bank.

See also

References

2018 establishments in Bihar
Colleges affiliated to Aryabhatta Knowledge University
Educational institutions established in 2018
Medical colleges in Bihar